is a Japanese photographer. He was born in Tokyo on 13 March 1947 as Shigeru Tamura (Tamura Shigeru). He studied at Tokyo College of Photography, graduating first in 1967 and then from a more advanced course two years later.

Tamura's first solo exhibition — under the name Shigeru Tamura — was Yume no hikari (Dream light) in Ginza Nikon Salon in 1969. He became known for his somewhat harsh monochrome depictions of landscapes. In 1974 his works appeared within the "New Japanese Photography" show in the Museum of Modern Art, New York.

Tamura made the stills for several of the late films of Akira Kurosawa, and has published a book of photographs taken on the sets of Kurosawa's films.

Notes

Books by Tamura
Tamura Photographs (1983)
Base. Tokyo: Mole, 1992. .
Kurosawa Akira (Akira Kurosawa). Tokyo: NTT, 1991. .

Sources and external links
 Tamura Photographs
 Nihon shashinka jiten (328 Outstanding Japanese Photographers). Kyoto: Tankōsha, 2000. .

1947 births
Japanese photographers
Living people
People from Tokyo
Tokyo College of Photography alumni